The Southern Tablelands is a geographic area of New South Wales, Australia, located south-west of Sydney and west of the Great Dividing Range.

The area is characterised by high, flat country which has generally been extensively cleared and used for grazing purposes.  The area is easily accessible to the Australian federal capital city of Canberra in the Australian Capital Territory. The area is included with the Southern Highlands and parts of the South West Slopes in the district that is known as Capital Country. In a wider sense, the term "Southern Tablelands" is also sometimes used to describe a broader region that includes the Monaro, the Southern Highlands and Australia's capital Canberra. The Southern Tablelands Temperate Grassland is a prominent vegetation community in the region.

Media 
93.5 Eagle FM, a radio station based in Goulburn, broadcasts to the majority of the Southern Tablelands.

See also

 Regions of New South Wales

References

 
Regions of New South Wales
Great Dividing Range